Ivor John Brown (30 May 1927 – 30 March 2005) was a motorcycle speedway rider and captain of Cradley Heathens speedway team during the 1960s. After retiring from riding he became promoter of Long Eaton and Scunthorpe speedway. His off-track occupation was postmaster and grocer of the village General Stores in Wymeswold.

Career
Born in Wymeswold, Leicestershire, Ivor Brown started speedway racing at Long Eaton in 1952, following earlier grasstrack riding, and moved to second-half rides at Birmingham and then Leicester. He made a few team appearances for Leicester Hunters between 1953 and 1959, but it was at Yarmouth that he first made regular team appearances, when he was skipper of the Yarmouth Bloaters team in the Southern Area League and the 1960 inaugural Provincial League competition, scoring 176 points from 18 matches. 

With the closure of Yarmouth he transferred to Cradley Heath Heathens for 1961. He topped the Provincial League averages and led the team to three Knockout Cup finals (including two wins) in four years.  In 1965 and the formation of an amalgamated British League he sustained serious injuries to his lower spine at the Wimbledon Internationale in a clash with Ove Fundin. Although he returned to racing the same season, his subsequent form suffered at this level and, with further injuries, he retired at the end of the 1968 season. In eight seasons at Cradley he averaged close to ten points per match. He was a regular holder of the Silver Sash, the Provincial League match race championship.

Brown died in 2005. A trophy named in his honour was contested in a challenge match between the successors to two of his former clubs, the Leicester Lions and the Dudley Heathens, in 2011.

References 

British Speedway Leagues 1946-1964,Peter Morrish 1984, Publisher: Midland Speedway Agency.

1927 births
2005 deaths
British speedway riders
English motorcycle racers
Cradley Heathens riders
Yarmouth Bloaters riders
People from Wymeswold
Sportspeople from Leicestershire